Batagur is a genus of large turtles from South and Southeast Asia. All members of the genus are seriously threatened. With a recent merger with members from two other genera, this genus has six described species.

Species
 Batagur affinis – southern river terrapin
 Batagur baska – northern river terrapin
 Batagur borneoensis – painted terrapin (formerly in Callagur)
 Batagur dhongoka – three-striped roofed turtle (formerly in Kachuga)
 Batagur kachuga – red-crowned roofed turtle (formerly in Kachuga)
 Batagur trivittata – Burmese roofed turtle (formerly in Kachuga)

References

 
Turtle genera
Taxa named by John Edward Gray